Stephanie Reid (born 22 July 1996) is an Australian basketball player.

College
Reid played college basketball for the University at Buffalo in Buffalo, New York, playing for the Bulls. She was the MVP of the 2016 MAC women's basketball tournament in which the Buffalo Bulls women's basketball team won their first MAC title and reached the NCAA tournament for the first time in the history of the women's program. Arriving from Australia just a month after graduating from high school in November 2014. Reid was rushed into college basketball by the UB coaching staff. Reid made the starting lineup in mid January 2015 and has remained the point guard for the team. She registered 349 points and 172 assists in the 2015-2016 season and is on track to make the 1000 point-500 assists club by senior year.

Statistics 

|-
| style="text-align:left;"| 2014–15
| style="text-align:left;"| Buffalo
| 19 || 17 || 28.4 || .429 || .333 || .714 || 2.7 || 3.4 || 0.8 || 0.1 || 2.7 || 6.7
|-
| style="text-align:left;"| 2015–16
| style="text-align:left;"| Buffalo
| 34 || 34 || 33.2 || .381 || .288 || .812 || 3.4 || 5.0 || 1.8 || 0.1 || 2.9 || 10.3
|-
| style="text-align:left;"| 2016–17
| style="text-align:left;"| Buffalo
| 32 || 32 || 32.7 || .403 || .191 || .734 || 3.1 || 7.2 || 2.0 || 0.1 || 2.5 || 11.5
|-
| style="text-align:left;"| 2017–18
| style="text-align:left;"| Buffalo
| 31 || 31 || 31.7 || .444 || .355 || .810 || 3.2 || 6.8 || 2.3 || 0.1 || 2.7 || 12.1
|-
| style="text-align:center;" colspan="2"| Career
| 116 || 114 || 31.9 || .410 || .286 || .771 || 3.0 || 5.8 || 1.8 || 0.06 || 2.7 || 10.5

Career

WNBL
Reid would begin her professional career with the Dandenong Rangers after signing for the 2018–19 WNBL season. After joining the Rangers, Reid would play alongside the likes of Rachel Jarry, Betnijah Laney and Rebecca Cole.

In 2019, Reid would remain with the franchise but under their new re-branded name, the Southside Flyers.

In 2020, Reid would travel North and sign with the Townsville Fire for the 2020–21 WNBL season.

References

External links
 The Plain Dealer
 Sports Illustrated
 Buffalo News
 Buffalo News
 Buffalo News

1996 births
Living people
Australian expatriate basketball people in the United States
Australian women's basketball players
Buffalo Bulls women's basketball players
Dandenong Rangers players
Medalists at the 2019 Summer Universiade
Point guards
Universiade gold medalists for Australia
Universiade medalists in basketball